Bradley Porteous (born 28 July 1998) is a South African cricketer. He made his first-class debut for KwaZulu-Natal in the 2018–19 CSA 3-Day Provincial Cup on 11 October 2018. He made his List A debut for KwaZulu-Natal in the 2018–19 CSA Provincial One-Day Challenge on 21 October 2018.

References

External links
 

1998 births
Living people
South African cricketers
KwaZulu-Natal cricketers
Place of birth missing (living people)